Vladas is a Lithuanian given name. Notable people with the name include:

Vladas Česiūnas
Vladas Drėma
Vladas Mikėnas
Vladas Mironas
Vladas Petronaitis
Vladas Tučkus
Vladas Zajanckauskas
Vladas Žulkus

See also
Vlada

Lithuanian masculine given names